Elections to the National Assembly of France were held in Algeria on 17 June 1951. Algeria had 30 of the 625 at the National Assembly.

These legislative elections were the last ones organized in Algeria under the Fourth Republic, in 1956 it was deemed impossible to organize elections in the midst of the Algerian War. The last French legislative elections organized in Algeria before independence were held in 1958.

Electoral system
As for the Algerian Assembly elected in 1948 and for the previous French legislative elections in 1945 and 1946, there were two electoral colleges, which each elected 15 deputies; one for the 1.5 million French citizens who were subject to French civil law (mainly people of European descent, plus those Algerian Jews who had been granted citizenship under the Crémieux Decree, and a few thousand Algerian Muslims who had been granted this status at their request when they became subject to French civil law), and another one for the millions of people who before 1946 had the civil status of indigénat. This was a legal status, and could not be changed simply by religious conversion.  In 1946 the Lamine Guèye law had given equal French citizenship and voting rights to the second group, subject to their voting in the second college, and with the right to vote of women citizens to be organised by the Algerian Assembly.  However, the Assembly never started to discuss the matter.

Results
The Second College elections, like the Algerian Assembly election of 1948, were rigged by the colonial administration to the detriment of the three anticolonial parties, the Movement for the Triumph of Democratic Liberties, the Democratic Union of the Algerian Manifesto and the Algerian Communist Party. The last one got two deputies in the European College, one in Alger and one in Oran.

Alger 

First College
 Adolphe Aumeran (1887–1980) Union algérienne (Républicains indépendants)
 Georges Blachette (1900–1980) Union list of Independents and of the Rally of the French People (Républicains indépendants)
 Paulin Colonna d'Istria (1905–1982) Union list of Independents and of the Rally of the French People (Rally of the French People) until 27 November 1951
 replaced by Jacques Chevallier Républicains indépendants from 27 January 1952
 Pierre Fayet (1887–1977) Algerian Communist Party
 Marcel Paternot (1912–1993) Union list of Independents and of the Rally of the French People  (Républicains indépendants)
 Marcel Ribère (1900–1966) Union list of Independents and of the Rally of the French People (Rally of the French People)

Second College
 Ahmed Aït-Ali (1886–1962) Popular Republican Movement (elected on the Concorde et entente républicaine list)
 Abderrahmane Bentounès (1913–2010) (French Section of the Workers' International in 1946-51) Centre républicain d'action paysanne et sociale et des démocrates indépendants (elected on the Concorde et entente républicaine list)
 Ali Ben Lakhdar Brahimi (1911–1976) French Section of the Workers' International (elected on the Concorde et entente républicaine list)
 Menouar Saïah (1905–1982) (former senator, 1948–1951) Radical Party (elected on the Concorde et entente républicaine list)
 Amar Smaïl (1901–1967) Radical Party (elected on the Concorde et entente républicaine list)

Constantine

First College

 Léon Haumesser (1903–1991) Rally of the French People
 René Mayer (1895–1972)(Minister of Justice) Radical Party (elected on the Rally of Republican Lefts list)
 Paul Pantaloni (1884–1973) Républicains indépendants
 Jules Valle (1894–1965)(Senator 1948-1951) Français indépendants

Second College

First district
 Mohamed Bengana (1914–1996) Radical Party
 Abdelkader Cadi (1904–1955) Democratic and Socialist Union of the Resistance (deceased on 2 January 1955)
 replaced through a by-election on 13 March 1955 by his brother Ali Cadi (1899–1963) Democratic and Socialist Union of the Resistance (resigns on 8 November 1955)

Second district
 Mostefa Benbahmed (1899–1978) French Section of the Workers' International
 Mohamed Salah Bendjelloul (1893–1985) Rally of the French People - ARS
 Youcef Kessous (1894–1952) Républicains indépendants (deceased on 1 June 1952)
 replaced on 13 July 1952 through a by-election (elected with 86% of the votes) by Amar Naroun (1906–1988) Républicains indépendants

Third district
 Allaoua Ben Aly Chérif (1895–1976) Popular Republican Movement
 Abdelmadjid Ourabah (1905–1967)(Senator 1946-1951) Radical Party

Oran 

First College
 Henri Fouques-Duparc (1903–1976)(senator in 1948-1951) Rally of the French People
 François Quilici (1905–1977) Républicains indépendants
 Maurice Rabier (1907–1999) French Section of the Workers' International
 Roger de Saivre (1908–1964) Centre républicain d'action paysanne et sociale et des démocrates indépendants
 Alice Sportisse Gomez-Nadal (1909–1996) Algerian Communist Party

Second College
 Djilali Hakiki (1907–1962) Radical Party
 Ahmed Mekki-Bezzeghoud (1883–1953) Radical Party (deceased on 23 July 1953)
 replaced by Chérif Sid Cara (fr)(1902–1999)(Senator in 1946-1953, Secretary of State in 1957-1958) Radical Party at a by-election on 20 September 1953
 Djelloul Ould Kadi ((1920–2000)) Democratic and Socialist Union of the Resistance

References

See also
1951 French legislative election
French legislative election, 1951 (Guinea)
 (on the Wikipedia in French) Liste des députés de l'Algérie française

Elections in Algeria
Legislative elections in France
Algeria
Algeria
Electoral fraud in Algeria
1951 in Algeria